Hel is a Swedish Viking rock band, based in Eskilstuna, Södermanland, Sweden.  The band's name is derived from the Norse goddess Hel.

History 
Hel formed in 1999 following the disintegration of Völund Smed, three of the Hel's five members having previously played in that band.  A major change from Völund Smed's lineup was that Hel would feature two female vocalists, Malin Pettersson and Ulrica Pettersson.  The first release of Hel's material was on the vikingarock compilation album, Carolus Rex IV.  As a result of the compilation's commercial success, Hel was initially signed to vikingrock group Ultima Thule's label, Ultima Thule Records, but later formed their own label, Peanut Music AB. 

The band toured internationally between 2001 and 2004, finally breaking up following the departure of violinist Cia Hedmark in 2004 to reform Völund Smed.

In 2008, Malin Pettersson, Ulrica Pettersson, and Adde Norlin debuted a new band called Tales of Origin. Whereas Hel sang in Swedish, Tales of Origin sings in English. Their first album was titled "Through Virgin Eyes."

Band members 
Ulrica Pettersson: vocals
Malin Pettersson: vocals, guitar
Esa Rosenström: guitar
Piere Karlsson: drums
Stefan Johansson: bass
Adde Norlin: vocals, acoustic- & electric guitar, bass, cello, piano, accordion, flute
Cia Hedmark: violin

Discography

Studio albums 
Valkyriors dom (1999)
Blodspår (2001)
Bortglömda tid (2002)
Det som varit ÄR (2003)

Appearances on compilation albums 
Carolus Rex IV (1999)
Genom eld och aska (split CD with Ultima Thule) (2000)
Carolus Rex V (2001)
Carolus Rex VI (2002)
Carolus Rex VII (2004)
Carolus Rex VIII (2006)

Video 
Hel - Live (DVD) (2005)

References

External links 
 
Profile and discography from vikingarock.se 
Eskilstuna-Kuriren:  Hel är trötta på naziststämpeln

1999 establishments in Sweden
Eskilstuna
Musical groups established in 1999
Swedish musical groups
Viking rock